Holding Back the Tears is the fourth studio album of Taiwan-born Malaysian Mandopop artist Freya Lim. It was released on 24 December 2010 by Rock Records. It is the third Mandarin and comeback album of Freya, after three years away from the music scene due to contractual issues with her previous record label Linfair Records Ltd.

The album is produced by renowned Taiwanese producer Jim Lee, who initially got Freya to perform two singles for Taiwan basketball drama Hot Shot soundtrack in 2008, and in turn helped to pave the way for Freya to release a new Mandarin album after her few years of hiatus.

Track listing

Music videos
 "重傷" (Wounded) MV 
 "五天幾年" (5 Days) MV 
 "眼淚流回去" (Holding Back the Tears) MV 
 "這樣愛你好可怕 " (Scared) MV feat. scenes from popular Taiwan TTV drama The Fierce Wife
 "記得懂得捨得" (Letting Go) MV

References

External links
  Freya Lim@Rock Records Taiwan

2010 albums
Freya Lim albums
Mandopop albums